MMSD is the ICAO code for the Los Cabos International Airport.

MMSD may also refer to:

Milwaukee Metropolitan Sewerage District
Madison Metropolitan School District